Scott Franklin may refer to:

Scott Franklin (politician), American politician
Scott Franklin (producer), American film producer
Scott Franklin (rugby union) (born 1980), Canadian rugby union player